This is a list of episodes for the seventh season of Everybody Loves Raymond.

Cast

Main
Ray Romano as Raymond "Ray" Barone
Patricia Heaton as Debra (née Whelan) Barone
Brad Garrett as Robert Barone
Doris Roberts as Marie Barone
Peter Boyle as Francis "Frank" Barone
 Madylin Sweeten as Alexandra "Ally" Barone
Sawyer Sweeten and Sullivan Sweeten as Geoffrey Barone and Michael Barone

Supporting 
 Monica Horan as Amy McDougall/Barone
 Georgia Engel as Pat MacDougall
 Fred Willard as Hank MacDougall
 Chris Elliott as Peter MacDougall
 Andy Kindler as Andy
 Jon Manfrellotti as Gianni 
 Sherri Shepherd as Judy
 Tom McGowan as Bernie Gruenfelder 

 Maggie Wheeler as Linda Gruenfelder 
 Victor Raider-Wexler as Stan
 Len Lesser as Garvin
 Fred Stoller as Gerard
 Amy Aquino as Peggy
 Alexandra Romano as Molly
 Albert Romano as Albert
 Max Rosenthal as Max
 Renata Scott as Harriet Lichtman

Episodes

References

2002 American television seasons
2003 American television seasons
Everybody Loves Raymond seasons